Topbağ is a village and municipality in the Qabala Rayon of Azerbaijan.  It has a population of 513.

References 

Populated places in Qabala District